Northhead is a rural locality in the Shire of Etheridge, Queensland, Australia.

Geography
The Gilbert River flows through from south to north, where it forms part of the northern boundary. The Robertson River enters from the south-east and joins the Gilbert in the centre.

References 

Shire of Etheridge
Localities in Queensland